Blackpool is a seaside town in England, United Kingdom.

Blackpool, black pool, or Black Pool may also refer to:

Places

United Kingdom
Blackpool (UK Parliament constituency), a former parliamentary constituency and its successors:
Blackpool North
Blackpool North and Cleveleys
Blackpool North and Fleetwood
Blackpool South
Blackpool, Devon, England, United Kingdom
Blackpool, Pembrokeshire, Wales, United Kingdom, a location
Borough of Blackpool, a district of Lancashire
Blackpool Gate, Cumbria, England, United Kingdom
Blackpool urban area, or Greater Blackpool, the urban area surrounding Blackpool, England, United Kingdom

Elsewhere
Blackpool Border Crossing, a border crossing in southern Quebec, Canada
Blackpool, New Zealand, a settlement
Blackpool, Cork, a suburb of Cork, Ireland
Black Pool, a hotspring in Yellowstone National Park, United States

Arts, entertainment, and media
Blackpool (TV serial), a 2004 BBC television drama series
Under Blackpool Lights, a DVD by The White Stripes

Finance
Dark pool, also known as black pool

Military
HMS Blackpool, the name of two ships of the Royal Navy

Sports
Black pool, a form of pocket billiards
A.F.C. Blackpool, an English football club
Blackpool Dance Festival, a prestigious English competition of ballroom dance
Blackpool F.C. (South Africa), a South African football club
Blackpool F.C., an English football club
Blackpool Panthers, a rugby league club
Mighty Blackpool F.C., a Sierra Leonean football club